Bradyrhizobium kavangense is a nitrogen-fixing bacterium from the genus Bradyrhizobium which has been isolated from the nodules of the cowpea Vigna unguiculata in the Kavango region in Namibia.

References

Nitrobacteraceae
Bacteria described in 2015